Lackawanna County is a county in the Commonwealth of Pennsylvania. It is located in Northeastern Pennsylvania and had a population of 215,896 as of the 2020 census. Its county seat and largest city is Scranton.

The county was created on August 13, 1878, following decades of trying to gain its independence from Luzerne County. Lackawanna was Pennsylvania's last county to be created, and the only county to be created after the American Civil War. It is named for the Lackawanna River.

Lackawanna County is the second largest county in the Scranton–Wilkes-Barre–Hazleton, PA Metropolitan statistical area. The Lehigh River, a  tributary of the Delaware River, flows through Lackawanna County.

History

Lackawanna County is a region that was developed for iron production and anthracite coal mining in the nineteenth century, with its peak of coal production reached in the mid-20th century. Scranton, then still part of Luzerne County, became a center of mining and industry. It was the site of the Lackawanna Iron and Coal Company, which later began to produce steel using the Bessemer process. In 1877 at the time of the Scranton General Strike, the company was managed by William Walker Scranton, whose father had been president until his death in 1872. Two of his cousins had been founders of the company and the city.

The county was created on August 13, 1878, following decades of trying to gain its independence from Luzerne County. (The courts were organized in October 1878.) It is Pennsylvania's last county to be created, and the only one created after the American Civil War. It is named for the Lackawanna River.

Geography
It has a humid continental climate which is warm-summer (Dfb) except along the Lackawanna River from Olyphant and Blakely below Peckville on down and along the Susquehanna where it is hot-summer (Dfa). Average monthly temperatures in downtown Scranton range from 26.0 °F in January to 71.9 °F in July, in Carbondale they range from 23.8 °F in January to 69.7 °F in July, and in Moscow they range from 22.6 °F in January to 68.4 °F in July.

Adjacent counties
Susquehanna County (north)
Wayne County (east)
Monroe County (southeast)
Luzerne County (southwest)
Wyoming County (west)

Major Highways

Demographics

2020 Statistics 
As of the 2020 census there were 215,896 people living in Lackawanna County. 83% were Non-Hispanic White, 4% Black or African American, 3.2% Asian, 0.3% Native American, 4% some other race and 6% were multiracial. In 2020 8.5% of the county was Hispanic or Latino.

2010 Statistics 
As of the 2010 census, there were 214,437 people living in the county. 92.0% were White, 2.5% Black or African American, 1.7% Asian, 0.2% Native American, 2.0% of some other race and 1.5% of two or more races. 5.0% were Hispanic or Latino (of any race). 20.1% identified as of Italian, 19.9% Irish, 13.0% Polish and 11.4% German ancestry.

As of the census of 2000, there were 213,295 people, 86,218 households, and 55,783 families living in the county.  The population density was 465 people per square mile (180/km2). There were 95,362 housing units at an average density of 208 per square mile (80/km2).  The racial makeup of the county was 96.65% White, 1.31% Black or African American, 0.09% Native American, 0.75% Asian, 0.01% Pacific Islander, 0.53% from other races, and 0.66% from two or more races.  1.39% of the population were Hispanic or Latino of any race. 22.5% were of Italian, 21.2% Irish, 15.4% Polish and 10.2% German ancestry.

There were 86,218 households, out of which 27.2% had children under the age of 18 living with them, 48.9% were married couples living together, 11.8% had a female householder with no husband present, and 35.3% were non-families; 31.3% of all households were made up of individuals, and 15.7% had someone living alone who was 65 years of age or older. The average household size was 2.38 and the average family size was 3.00.

In the county, 21.8% of the population was under the age of 18, 8.9% from 18 to 24, 26.4% from 25 to 44, 23.5% from 45 to 64, and 19.5% who were 65 years of age or older. The median age was 40 years. For every 100 females, there were 89.30 males. For every 100 females age 18 and over, there were 85.4 males.

Politics and government

|}

According to the Secretary of State's office, Democrats hold a majority of the voters in Lackawanna County.

The Democratic Party has been historically dominant in county-level politics since the rise of new immigrant populations and their descendants since the mid-19th century. The county is part of Pennsylvania's 8th congressional district.

On the state and national levels, Lackawanna County has strongly favored the Democratic Party for the last ninety years. It leaned Republican from 1896 to 1924, only failing to back William Howard Taft during that timespan when the party's vote was split between him and former president Theodore Roosevelt. The county has only voted for the Republican candidate three times since 1928: in the national Republican landslides of 1956, 1972, and 1984. In 2000, Democrat Al Gore won 60% of the vote and Republican George W. Bush won 36%. In 2004 Democrat John Kerry received 56% of the vote and Bush received 42%. In 2006, Democrats Governor Ed Rendell and Senator Bob Casey, Jr., won 70% and 73% of the vote in Lackawanna County, respectively. In 2008 three of four Democrats running statewide carried the county, with Barack Obama receiving 63% of the county vote to 37% for John McCain. Although Obama easily carried Lackawanna County again in 2012, Donald Trump came very close to beating Hillary Clinton in 2016. However, in 2020, Lackawanna County voted for Joe Biden, a native son of the county, by over 8 points, an improvement over Clinton's margin but not as high as either of Obama's. In Lackawanna County, Democratic strength primarily comes from the city of Scranton and its immediate suburbs, while Republicans do better in the more rural, outer parts of the county.

County commissioners

County Row Officers

United States House of Representatives 
:

United States Senate 
:

State House of Representatives 
:

State Senate 
:

Education

Lackawanna County Workforce investment Board - Scranton

Colleges and universities
 Clarks Summit University
 Johnson College
 Keystone College (also in Wyoming County)
 Lackawanna College
 Marywood University
 Penn State Scranton
 Geisinger Commonwealth School of Medicine
 University of Scranton

Public K-12 schools

Public school districts
They include:
 Abington Heights School District
 Carbondale Area School District
 Dunmore School District
 Forest City Regional School District (also in Susquehanna and Wayne Counties)
 Lackawanna Trail School District (also in Wyoming County)
 Lakeland School District
 Mid Valley School District
 North Pocono School District (also in Wayne County)
 Old Forge School District
 Riverside School District
 Scranton School District
 Valley View School District

Charter schools
Fell Charter Elementary School, Simpson, GR K-8
Howard Gardner Multiple Intelligence Charter School, Scranton, GR PreK-8
Scranton School for Deaf and Hard-of-Hearing Children – public charter school offering pre-K through 12th-grade education to eligible deaf and hard-of-hearing children located in South Abington Township, Pennsylvania

Public vocational technology schools
Career Technology Center of Lackawanna County

State-operated schools
Scranton State School for the Deaf was in the county until it closed in 2009.

Intermediate unit
Northeastern Educational Intermediate Unit #19 (NEIU19) provides a wide variety of specialized services to public and private schools. It serves the school communities of Lackawanna County, Wayne County, and Susquehanna County. NEIU19 is governed by a board of appointed officials one from the elected school board of each member public school district. Among the serves are: professional development programs for school employees, background/criminal screening of public school employment applicants, technology support to the schools, and special education services. The Intermediate Unit coordinates and supervises the Special Education transportation.

Diocesan schools
The county is also served by the Diocese of Scranton. The Diocese of Scranton operates four regional systems of diocesan schools, which were established after the area received hundreds of thousands of Catholic immigrants. The Holy Cross School System serves Lackawanna County, and is currently composed of seven elementary centers and one secondary center. The Holy Cross System is the second-largest of the four systems, and Holy Cross High School is the only diocesan high school operating a capacity. The Holy Cross System is the result of diocese-wide consolidations made in 2007 in response to decades of declining enrollment as population declined in the area.

As recently as 2000, Lackawanna County was home to four Catholic high schools and nearly fifteen elementary schools. While the current configuration of sites and schools educates a fraction of the students once enrolled in Catholic schools in Lackawanna County, vast improvements have been made to the curriculum. Millions of dollars of capital gains have been invested in the buildings and technologies of the schools. As part of the ongoing effort to stabilize enrollment and offer a sustainable school system which is "spiritually sound and academically excellent", the Holy Cross System is embarking on a more aggressive advertising campaign to promote Catholic education and establish stronger and more diverse programs at the elementary level.

Sacred Heart Elementary in Carbondale and Marian Catholic Elementary in Scranton were closed in 2011 and were incorporated into LaSalle Academy and All Saint's Academy, respectively. This cut the costs of sustaining two faculties and buildings which collectively operated at less than 50% capacity. It bolstered the enrollments of the hubs of elementary education. 
Holy Cross High School, Dunmore
Our Lady of Peace Elementary, Clarks Green
St. Mary of Mount Carmel Elementary, Dunmore
LaSalle Academy, Dickson City and Jessup
All Saints Academy, Scranton
St. Clare/St. Paul Elementary, Scranton

Private schools
As reported by the Pennsylvania Department of Education:

Abington Christian School, Clarks Green, GR PreK-8 (Affiliated with the Assemblies of God)
Bais Yaakov of Scranton, GR 9-12 (All girls Jewish school)
DePaul School for Dyslexia, Scranton
Friendship House
Geneva Christian School, Olyphant, GR PreK-8
Giant Steps Child Development Center – Carbondale
Kinder Kampus Preparatory Preschool, Archbald, PreK
Little People Daycare School, Scranton, GR PreK-KG
Lourdesmont School, Scranton, Special Education (Roman Catholic)
Lutheran Academy – Scranton, GR PreK-6
Marywood – Tony Damiano Early Childhood Center, Scranton, GR PreK-KG
Milton Eisner Yeshiva High School, Scranton, GR 9-12 (All boys Jewish school)
Montessori Kindergarten, Scranton, GR PreK-KG
New Story, Throop, Special Education
NHS Autism School, Scranton, Special Education
Northeast Child Care Services – Archbald
Pocono Mountain Bible Conference – Gouldsboro
Revival Baptist Christian School, Scranton, GR K-12
Scranton Hebrew Day School, Scranton, GR K-8
Scranton Preparatory School, Scranton, GR 9-12 (Affiliated with the Society of Jesus)
St. Gregory's Early Childhood Center, Clarks Green, GR PreK-KG
St. Stanislaus Elementary School, Scranton, GR K-8 (Polish National Catholic Church)
Summit Christian Academy, South Abington Township, PreK-12
Triboro Christian Academy, Old Forge, K-12, It participates in the state's Pennsylvania System of School Assessment (PSSA) annual testing

Libraries

Abington Community Library – Clarks Summit
Carbondale Public Library – Carbondale
Children's Library – Scranton
Dalton Community Library – Dalton
Nancy Kay Holmes Branch – Scranton
North Pocono Public Library – Moscow
Scranton Public Library – Scranton
Taylor Community Library – Taylor
Valley Community Library – Peckville
Waverly Memorial Library – Waverly

Recreation
 Montage Mountain Ski Area
 Lackawanna State Park
 Archbald Pothole State Park
 The Dick and Nancy Eales Preserve at Moosic Mountain
 Pinchot Trail System
 Lackawanna River Heritage Trail
 Lake Scranton Walking Trail
 PNC Field 
 Merli-Sarnoski Park
 Nay Aug Park
 McDade Park
 Aylesworth Park
 Covington Park

Communities

Under Pennsylvania law, there are four types of incorporated municipalities: cities, boroughs, townships, and one town. The following cities, boroughs and townships are located in Lackawanna County:

Cities
Carbondale
Scranton (county seat)

Boroughs

Archbald
Blakely
Clarks Green
Clarks Summit
Dalton
Dickson City
Dunmore
Jermyn
Jessup
Mayfield
Moosic
Moscow
Old Forge
Olyphant
Taylor
Throop
Vandling

Townships

Benton
Carbondale
Clifton
Covington
Elmhurst
Fell
Glenburn
Greenfield
Jefferson
La Plume
Madison
Newton
North Abington
Ransom
Roaring Brook
Scott
South Abington
Spring Brook
Thornhurst
Waverly
West Abington

Census-designated places
 Big Bass Lake (partially in Wayne County)
 Chinchilla
 Eagle Lake
 Glenburn
 Mount Cobb
 Simpson
 Waverly

Unincorporated communities
 Daleville
 Milwaukee
 Winton

Population ranking
The population ranking of the following table is based on the 2010 census of Lackawanna County.

† county seat

See also
 National Register of Historic Places listings in Lackawanna County, Pennsylvania

References

Further reading
 Aileen Sallom Freeman and Jack McDonough, Lackawanna County: An Illustrated History. Montgomery, AL: Community Communications, 2000.
 Thomas F. Murphy, Jubilee History: Commemorative of the Fiftieth Anniversary of the Creation of Lackawanna County, Pennsylvania: Story of Interesting Events from Indian Occupancy of Valley, Connecticut Settlement, Organization of Luzerne County, Start of Anthracite Industry, and Forty Years Effort to Establish Lackawanna County Topeka, KS: Historical Publishing Co., 1928.
 Portrait and Biographical Record of Lackawanna County, Pennsylvania. New York: Chapman Publishing Co., 1897.

External links
Official website

 
1878 establishments in Pennsylvania
Anthracite Coal Region of Pennsylvania
Counties of Appalachia
Pocono Mountains
Populated places established in 1878
Scranton, Pennsylvania